Eclipse Island Lighthouse is an active lighthouse in Eclipse Island off the south coast of Western Australia

History
It was built in 1926 as a cylindrical tower made of concrete. Initially, it was a staffed light using kerosene as lantern fuel in combination with a first order Fresnel lens. In 1976 the lantern was completely removed and the optic was put on display at the Western Australian Museum. Today the light is emitted from atop a mast on the lighthouse's concrete trunk.

Three family quarters made of brick with fibro roofing along with several outbuildings, concrete tanks and bases, generator shed, helipad and a concrete landing can be found around the lighthouse. A trestle based light gauge railway and cable towers are also found in the lighthouse precinct, and was all constructed during the interwar period.

See also

 List of lighthouses in Australia
 List of places on the State Register of Heritage Places in the City of Albany

Notes

References

External links
 Eclipse Island Lighthouse Lighthouses of Australia Inc.

Lighthouses completed in 1926
Lighthouses in Western Australia
State Register of Heritage Places in the City of Albany
South coast of Western Australia
Buildings and structures in Albany, Western Australia